The men's discus throw event at the 2014 World Junior Championships in Athletics was held in Eugene, Oregon, USA, at Hayward Field on 25 and 26 July.  A 1.75 kg (junior implement) discus was used.

Medalists

Results

Final
26 July
Start time: 16:05  Temperature: 30 °C  Humidity: 31 %
End time: 17:02  Temperature: 31 °C  Humidity: 27 %

Qualifications
25 July
With qualifying standard of 59.00 (Q) or at least the 12 best performers (q) advance to the Final

Summary

Details
With qualifying standard of 59.00 (Q) or at least the 12 best performers (q) advance to the Final

Group A
26 July
Start time; 09:58  Temperature: 14 °C  Humidity: 82 %
End time: 10:33  Temperature: 18 °C  Humidity: 64 %

Group B
26 July
Start time; 11:09  Temperature: 18 °C  Humidity: 64 %
End time: 11:38  Temperature: 21 °C  Humidity: 53 %

Participation
According to an unofficial count, 28 athletes from 20 countries participated in the event.

References

Discus throw
Discus throw at the World Athletics U20 Championships